AMAB or Amab may refer to:
 Assigned male at birth
 -amab, nomenclature of monoclonal antibodies
 Amab, agriculturalists in Yenga, Uganda

See also
 G-AMAB, an Airspeed Ambassador